Haplogroup GHIJK, defined by the SNPs M3658, F1329, PF2622, and YSC0001299, is a common Y-chromosome haplogroup. This macrohaplogroup and its subclades contain the vast majority of the world's existing male population.

Phylogeny
GHIJK is the major clade of Haplogroup F (F-M89). It branches subsequently into two direct descendants: Haplogroup G (M201/PF2957) and Haplogroup HIJK (F929/M578/PF3494/S6397). The other haplotypes of Haplogroup F are F1, F2, and F3.

Subclades of GHIJK, under the HIJK lineage, include: H (L901/M2939) and IJK (F-L15). The downstream descendants of Haplogroup IJK include the major haplogroups I, J, K, L, M, N, O,  P, Q, R, S  and T.

Distribution
The basal paragroup GHIJK* has not been identified in living males or ancient remains.

Populations with high proportions of descendant haplogroups were predominant, before the modern era, in males across widely-dispersed areas and populations. These include:
 the Caucasus and West Asia  (e. g. haplogroups G, J, and R);
 South Asia (e. g. haplogroups H, J, L, and R); 
 Europe  (e. g. haplogroups G, I, J, Q, R and N);
 East Asia, Southeast Asia and Oceania (e.g. haplogroups K, M, N, P, O, S)
 Central Asia (e. g. haplogroups J, P, Q, and R) and;
 most Native American peoples (e. g. haplogroup Q and R)

Footnotes

See also

Genetics

Backbone Tree

GHIJK